Mateo Panadić (born 6 October 1994) is a Croatian footballer who plays as a midfielder or attacker for Football Superleague of Kosovo club Ferizaj.

Career

Before the second half of 2013/14, Panadić signed for the reserves of Austria Wien, one of Austria's most successful clubs, after playing for Gorica (Croatia) in the Croatian second division.

Before the second half of 2014/15, he signed for Croatian third division side Vrapče, before trialing for Chemnitzer FC in the German third division.

In 2015, he signed for the reserves of German Bundesliga side Schalke.

Before the 2016 season, Panadić signed for Assyriska in the Swedish second division through a fan fundraiser.

Before the second half of 2016/17, he signed for Slovenian top flight team Aluminij, where he made 8 league appearances and scored 0 goals.

Before the second half of 2018/19, Panadić signed for Wiener Neustadt in the Austrian second division after playing for Slovenian second division outfit Brežice, where he made 10 appearances and scored 0 goals.

In 2019, he signed for Rogaška in the Slovenian second division.

Personal life
Panadić is the son of Yugoslavia international Andrej Panadić.

References

External links
 
 

1994 births
Living people
Footballers from Zagreb
Association football midfielders
Association football forwards
Croatian footballers
HNK Gorica players
FK Austria Wien players
NK Vrapče players
FC Schalke 04 II players
Assyriska FF players
NK Aluminij players
NK Brežice 1919 players
SC Wiener Neustadt players
NK Rogaška players
NK Rudar Velenje players
Partizán Bardejov players
KF Ferizaj players
First Football League (Croatia) players
Austrian Regionalliga players
Regionalliga players
Superettan players
Slovenian PrvaLiga players
Slovenian Second League players
2. Liga (Austria) players
2. Liga (Slovakia) players
Football Superleague of Kosovo players
Croatian expatriate footballers
Expatriate footballers in Austria
Croatian expatriate sportspeople in Austria
Expatriate footballers in Germany
Croatian expatriate sportspeople in Germany
Expatriate footballers in Sweden
Croatian expatriate sportspeople in Sweden
Expatriate footballers in Slovenia
Croatian expatriate sportspeople in Slovenia
Expatriate footballers in Slovakia
Croatian expatriate sportspeople in Slovakia
Expatriate footballers in Kosovo
Croatian expatriate sportspeople in Kosovo